William Hopkins (died 19 July 1647) was an English politician who won election to the House of Commons in 1647.

Hopkins was  described as "the most eminent and truly religious magistrate of Bewdley" and a "gracious and able Christian". In 1647, he was elected Member of Parliament for Bewdley in a double return. The election was declared void and he died before the by-election. 
 
Hopkins was buried at Ribbesford on 21 July 1647.

Hopkins married Helen Vickaris on 30 October 1609.

References

Year of birth missing
1647 deaths
English MPs 1640–1648
Politicians from Worcestershire